Kremitzaue is a municipality in the Elbe-Elster district, in Brandenburg, Germany.

History
From 1815 to 1944, the constituent localities of Kremitzaue were part of the Prussian Province of Saxony. From 1944 to 1945, they were part of the Province of Halle-Merseburg. From 1952 to 1990, they were part of the Bezirk Cottbus of East Germany. On 31 December 2001, the municipality of Kremitzaue was formed by merging the municipalities of Kolochau, Malitschkendorf and Polzen.

Demography

References

Localities in Elbe-Elster